Osakabegawa Dam is a dam in the Okayama Prefecture, Japan, completed in 1954.

References 

Dams in Okayama Prefecture
Dams completed in 1954